Sikdar, Sikder or Shikdar is an Indian (mainly Bengali) and Bangladeshi surname. Sikdar means owner of one siki (one quarter) of land. This title was given by the British Government.

Notable people with surname Sikdar 
 Jyotirmoyee Sikdar, an Indian athlete and politician.
 Sutapa Sikdar, Hindi film screenwriter.
 Radhanath Sikdar, Indian mathematician, calculated the height of Peak XV in the Himalaya which was later named Mount Everest.
 Tapan Sikdar, former Union minister of state in the National Democratic Alliance government.
 Siraj Sikder was a Bangladeshi revolutionary politician.
 Ershad Sikdar, was a Bangladeshi criminal and serial killer, known for committing various crimes such as murder, torture, theft, robbery and others to 7 to 43+ victims.

References 

 

Bengali-language surnames
Bengali Hindu surnames
Bengali Muslim surnames